The Torse (in its upper course also Ruisseau du Prignon) is a stream in the southeast of France. It runs from Saint-Marc-Jaumegarde to the Arc in Aix-en-Provence.

References

Rivers of France
Rivers of Bouches-du-Rhône
Rivers of Provence-Alpes-Côte d'Azur